Ministro Carranza is a station on Line D of the Buenos Aires Underground. It connects with Ministro Carranza station on the Mitre Line commuter rail service. The station was opened on 29 December 1987 as the western terminus of the extension of Line D from Palermo. On 31 May 1997, the line was extended to José Hernández.

References

External links

Buenos Aires Underground stations
1987 establishments in Argentina